Ahmo Kathleen Hight (born September 18, 1973) is an American fitness model, swimsuit model and actress. She first rose to prominence in winning the Ms. Fitness USA (Western States Division) tournament and Ms. Fit Body Bay Area in 1994, after which she began modeling for fitness and muscle magazines. In 1997, she launched an acting career (sometimes using the name Amy Hite) and appeared in several made-for-video and made-for cable films, mostly of softcore porn genre. She also appeared in videos produced by Playboy magazine. She appeared opposite Anna Nicole Smith in the faux documentary Anna Nicole Smith Exposed, as well as episodes of the television series Pacific Blue and Hotel Exotica.

Reality television

Real Chance of Love
Hight was a contestant on the VH1 reality series Real Chance of Love, where brothers Ahmad "Real" Givens and Kamal "Chance" Givens have seventeen women competing for their love in two separate groups: "Real Girls" and "Chance Girls". Hight appeared on the show under the nickname of "Milf." On the show, which premiered October 20, 2008, Hight stated that she was 35 years old and had a 9-year-old son. Hight was in the top three for the "Real Girls" but was eliminated on Episode 10 of the eleven competitive episodes. She appeared in a total of twelve of the fourteen episodes.

I Love Money
In early 2009, Hight appeared on the second season of the VH1 reality series I Love Money and was eliminated in the fifth episode, leaving her in fourteenth place. She appeared on six of the fifteen episodes.

Personal life
Hight has a son. On March 26, 2015, she was charged with second degree assault and domestic assault, after stabbing a man with a pair of scissors in Watertown, Minnesota.

References

External links

 

Living people
1973 births